Dahinden is a surname. Notable people with the surname include:

Justus Dahinden (born 1925), Swiss architect
Martin Dahinden (born 1955), Swiss diplomat
René Dahinden (1930–2001), Canadian Bigfoot researcher
Roland Dahinden (born 1962), Swiss trombonist and composer